The Central Bank of Belize is the central bank of Belize, established in 1982. In 2021 Gustavo Manuel Vasquez was chosen to serve as Governor, replacing A. Joy Grant, who had served in the role since 2016.

History 
The Central Bank of Belize was established on January 1, 1982, by the Central Bank of Belize Act No. 15 (Chapter 262 of the Laws of Belize Revised Edition 2000).

The Central Bank is the natural successor to the Monetary Authority of Belize, established from 1976 to 1981, and the Board of Commissioners of Currency running from 1894. The latter is responsible for the devaluation crisis that led to the nationalist movement of the 1950s.

Governors
Edney Cain, January 1982 - October 1983
Robert Clifton Swift, November 1983 - January 1986
Alan Slusher, February 1986 - November 1990
Edney Cain, January 1991 - December 1991
Keith Arnold, January 1992 - March 2002
Jorge Meliton Auil, April 2002 - September 2003
Sydney Campbell, October 2003 - September 2008
Glenford Ysaguirre, October 2008 - September 2016
A. Joy Grant, October 2016 - April 2021
Gustavo Manuel Vasquez, April 2021 - August 2021 
Kareem Michael, December 2021 - Present

See also

 Ministry of Finance (Belize)
 Belize dollar
 Economy of Belize

References

External links
 

Belize
Banks of Belize
Banks established in 1982
1982 establishments in Belize
Economy of Belize
Government of Belize